Graciela Kaminsky is a Professor of Economics and International Affairs at George Washington University and a Faculty Research Associate at the National Bureau of Economic Research. Kaminsky studied Economics at the Massachusetts Institute of Technology where she received her Ph.D. In 1984 she did a brief research stay at the Argentine Central Bank, later in 1985 she moved to San Diego as an assistant professor at the University of California. In 1992 she worked on the Board of Governors of the US Federal Reserve System, later in 1998 she was appointed a full professor at George Washington University where she works at the Elliot School of International Affairs. Kaminsky has been a visiting scholar at the Bank of Japan, the Bank of Spain, the Federal Reserve Bank of New York, the Hong Kong Monetary Authority, and the Central Bank of France.

Kaminsky’s research focuses on contagion, currency and financial crises, exchange rates, fiscal and monetary policies, international capital flows as well as sovereign debt crises. She has published numerous academic journals including the American Economic Review, the Journal of Economic Perspectives, Journal of Development Economics, Journal of Monetary Economics and the Journal of International Economics. Furthermore, her research has been highlighted in the financial media such as Business Week, The Financial Times and The Economist.

Research in fiscal and monetary policy 
One of Kaminsky’s first publications was “Is there a Peso Problem? Evidence from the Dollar/Pound Exchange Rate” published for the American Economic Review in 1994 and explores whether exchange rate forecasts are rational. She notes that investors can be rational and yet make repeated mistakes if the true model of the exchange rate evolved over time. Kaminsky concludes that exchange rate process has been evolving over time, capturing the changing regimes in the market fundamentals.

In 1996, alongside Karen K. Lewis, Kaminsky published, "Does foreign exchange intervention signal future monetary policy?" which seeks to empirically examine the effects of foreign exchange intervention on the exchange rate.

Two years later Kaminsky wrote "High Real Interest Rates in the Aftermath of Disinflation: Is it a Lack of Credibility" co-authored with Leonardo Leiderman and examines whether the lack of credibility of investors who assumed the stabilization programs in Argentina, Israel and Mexico in the mid-1980s are to blame for the high real interest rates in the months after the launch of the program.

In 2004 alongside Carmen M. Reinhart and Carlos A. Vegh they published "When it Rains, it Pours: Procyclical Capital Flows and Macroeconomic Policies" for the National Bureau of Economic Research. They document the capital flows, fiscal policy and monetary policy based on a sample of 104 countries. They claim that net capital inflows, fiscal policy and monetary policy appear to be procyclical for the majority of developing countries. Furthermore, periods of capital inflows are associated with expansionary macroeconomic policies and periods of capital outflows with contractionary policies in developing countries with emerging markets.

In 2010 in "Terms of Trade Shocks and Fiscal Cycles", Kaminsky examined the links between fiscal policy and terms of trade fluctuation using a sample of 74 countries both from developing and developed backgrounds. She concludes that booms in the terms of trade do not necessarily lead to larger government surpluses in developing countries, especially in emerging markets. However, this is not the case in OECD countries, where fiscal policy is of a unique nature.

In February 2016 Alongside Pablo Vega-García she did an extensive research analyzing sovereign debt defaults from years 1820 to the Great Depression with a special focus on Latin America titled, "Systematic and Idiosyncratic Sovereign Debt Crises". They found that 63% of the crises were of a systematic nature. What these crises had in common were the international collapse of liquidity and the growth slowdown in the financial centers.

In December 2016 she published "Globalization in the Periphery: Monetary Policy: What is Gained, What is Lost" which focuses on the general misconceptions of globalization. She presents evidence that indicates that globalization has brought on better institutions and policies in developing countries. She notes that monetary policies in developing countries are now less ties to financing fiscal deficits and inflation.

Research in currency and financial crises 

Written for the Journal of Development Economics in 1996, "The Debt Crises: Lessons of the 1980s for the 1990s" by Kaminsky and Alfredo Pereira underlines the growth collapse of the Latin American debtor countries. Both academics seek to prove the popular claims that the debt crises is the main reason for the growth collapse in these countries. They found that once they accounted for social inequality on government policy and consumption, the burden of servicing the debt becomes an important factor in explaining the overall investment and economic growth in Latin America.

In March 1998, Kaminsky wrote "Leading Indicators of Currency Crises" alongside Saul Lizondo and Carmen M Reinhart examining the evidence on currency crises. More specifically, the authors propose an early warning system which involves monitoring the evolution of indicators that tend to exhibit a systematic behavior in the periods where a crisis soon follows. The main indicators identified in the paper are the behaviour of international reserves, real exchange rates, domestic credit, credit to the public sector and domestic inflation. Furthermore, if any of these indicators is offset, the probability of a crises occurring is probable within the following 24 months of the indicators issuing a signal.

Similarly, Kaminsky and Carmen M. Reinhart wrote "Financial Crises in Asian and Latin America: Then and Now" comparing the economies of both regions from the 1970s-1990s. Both authors also wrote "The Twin Crises: The Causes of Banking and Balance-of-Payments Problem" and analyzed the links between banking and currency crises. They find that a banking crises tends to precede a currency crises – this currency crises worsens the banking crises which in turn creates a vicious spiral. The authors find that crises occur as the economy enters into a recession, after booming economic activity that was fueled by credit, capital inflows and an overvalued currency.

Kaminsky does a thorough analysis of the crisis in Asia in "What Triggers Market Jitters: A Chronicle of the Asian Crisis" and what type of news moves the economy into a market jitter. Kaminsky found that local and neighbour-country news and their updates regarding international agreements have a substantial effect. In 2000, Graciela Kaminsky and Carmen M. Reinhart published "On Crises, Contagion and Confusion" in the Journal of International Economics and they assess through which channels the crises spread by assessing both trade and financial links.

In 2001 Kaminsky proposed a new approach to examine the behaviour of international integration of financial markets in "Short- and Long Run Integration: Do Capital Control Matter". Kaminsky found markets seem to be linked at longer rather than short run integration of economies with world financial markets. She found little evidence that capital controls do in fact insulate domestic markets from global spillovers.

"Financial Markets in Times of Stress" was published in 2002 for the Journal of Development Economics alongside Carmen M. Reinhart. Both authors examined which markets are most synchronized internationally and exhibit the greater extent of co-movement. The focus on asset markets such as; bonds, equities, foreign exchange, and domestic money market. The research seek to analyze which markets show evidence of co-movement irrespective of whether there are adverse shocks or not. Similar to this research is Kaminsky’s paper for the Journal of International Money and Finance in 2006 titled, "Currency Crises: Are they all the Same?".

In 2007 Kaminsky and Marco Cipriani published "Volatility in International Financial Market Issuance: The Role of the Financial Center" for the Hong Kong Institute for Monetary Research. Together they studied the pattern of volatility of gross issuance in international capital markets since the 1980s. They found short episodes of high volatility however this declines on the long run suggesting that international financial integration has not made financial markets more erratic.

Awards and recognition 

2017: Oscar and Shoshana Trachtenberg Prize for Faculty Scholarship (Research)
January 2014–December 2018: INET, The Institute for New Economic Thinking Award (Award $186,994)

References

Living people
American women economists
Elliott School of International Affairs faculty
MIT School of Humanities, Arts, and Social Sciences alumni
University of California, San Diego faculty
Year of birth missing (living people)